Sommerer House may refer to:

Sommerer House (South Bend, Indiana)
John M. and Lillian Sommerer House, Jefferson City, Missouri
Lansdown-Higgins House, Jefferson City, Missouri, also known as the Sommerer House